The shooting of Eddie Hutch Snr occurred on 8 February 2016. Eddie was the brother of Gerry Hutch, the leader of the Hutch gang, which was in a feud with the Kinahan gang, led by Christy Kinahan. The feud of the two criminal gangs, called the 2015–16 Irish gangland feud, in the Republic of Ireland resulted in the deaths of ten people.

Before shooting
Eddie was a brother of Gerry Hutch and was considered a non-violent criminal, having convictions for small-time fraud and shoplifting. Eddie took legal action when courts decided that he did not qualify for compensation from Dublin Corporation when his local authority home burned down while he was in prison for breaching a barring order. Eventually he was awarded the full IR£20,000 amount.

However, he had been suspected of helping his brother launder proceeds from crime and was one of a large number of his brothers' associates targeted by Operation Alpha, the first major operation of the Criminal Assets Bureau (CAB). A bank account in his name containing €160,000 was seized by the CAB.

He had also worked as a taxi driver. He was an uncle of Gary Hutch who was shot dead in September 2015.

Shooting
Men broke into his house on Poplar Row, North Strand, Dublin at about 7.45pm on 8 February, and Eddie Hutch was shot nine times. His partner was at home at the time, but was not injured.

The motive for his killing is thought by Gardaí to be revenge for the shooting of David Byrne.

References

People murdered in the Republic of Ireland
Deaths by firearm in the Republic of Ireland
Deaths by person in the Republic of Ireland
Irish murder victims
Unsolved murders in Ireland
Taxi drivers
February 2016 crimes in Europe
2016 murders in the Republic of Ireland
Organised crime events in Ireland
Hutch Organised Crime Group